The discography of American girl group Girlicious consists of two studio albums and seven singles. Their self-titled debut album was released in Canada on August 12, 2008 and later re-released as a Deluxe Edition in December 2008. The album reached number two on the Canadian Albums Chart and was certified platinum for over 80,000 copies sold. The album spawned three singles: "Like Me", "Stupid Shit" and "Baby Doll". The singles all achieved chart success in Canada, reaching the peaks of four, twenty, and fifty-five respectively.

The group's second studio album, Rebuilt, was released on November 22, 2010 via Universal Music Canada. The album's first single titled "Over You" reached number fifty-two on the Canadian Hot 100. The group released a second single from the album, "Maniac", which peaked at number seventy-four. "2 in the Morning" was released as the group's third single and peaked at number thirty-five. "Hate Love" was released as the group's final single from Rebuilt and has since reached the peak of sixty-six.

Albums

Studio albums

Extended plays

Singles

Other charted songs

Music videos

References

Discographies of American artists